Garabulag or Aknaghbyur is a village in the Khojaly District of Azerbaijan, in the disputed region of Nagorno-Karabakh. The village had an ethnic Armenian-majority population prior to the 2020 Nagorno-Karabakh war, and also had an Armenian majority in 1989.

History 
During the Soviet period, the village was part of the Askeran District of the Nagorno-Karabakh Autonomous Oblast. The village was administrated as part of the Askeran Province of the Republic of Artsakh after the First Nagorno-Karabakh War. The village was captured by Azerbaijan on 7 November 2020, during the 2020 Nagorno-Karabakh war.

Historical heritage sites 
Historical heritage sites in and around the village include a cemetery from between the 17th and 19th centuries, the 19th-century church of Surb Astvatsatsin, a 19th-century watermill, and a 20th-century bridge.

Demographics 
The village had 578 inhabitants in 2005, and 612 inhabitants in 2015.

References

External links 
 

Populated places in Askeran Province
Populated places in Khojaly District